Herschel Bay is an Arctic waterway in Qikiqtaaluk Region, Nunavut, Canada. It is located in Nares Strait, west of Smith Sound. Ellesmere Island is to the east, while Pim Island's Cape Sabine is to the northeast.

References

Bays of Qikiqtaaluk Region